Brucejack/Bowser Aerodrome  is located  southeast of Brucejack Mine, British Columbia, Canada.

References

Registered aerodromes in British Columbia
Regional District of Kitimat–Stikine